Gabrovo Knoll is a peak rising to 500m in the Friesland Ridge, Tangra Mountains, Livingston Island.  The peak surmounts Charity Glacier to the north and Tarnovo Ice Piedmont to the southeast, and is separated from Shumen Peak to the east-northeast by Gerov Pass.  The knoll is named after the Bulgarian town of Gabrovo.

Location

Maps
 L.L. Ivanov et al. Antarctica: Livingston Island and Greenwich Island, South Shetland Islands. Scale 1:100000 topographic map. Sofia: Antarctic Place-names Commission of Bulgaria, 2005.
 L.L. Ivanov. Antarctica: Livingston Island and Greenwich, Robert, Snow and Smith Islands. Scale 1:120000 topographic map.  Troyan: Manfred Wörner Foundation, 2009.

References
 Gabrovo Knoll. SCAR Composite Gazetteer of Antarctica
 Bulgarian Antarctic Gazetteer. Antarctic Place-names Commission. (details in Bulgarian, basic data in English)

External links
 Gabrovo Knoll. Copernix satellite image

Tangra Mountains
Gabrovo